Marcelo Josemir Saracchi Pinto (born 23 April 1998) is a Uruguayan professional footballer who plays as a left-back for Spanish club Levante.

Club career

Early career
Born in Paysandú, Saracchi joined hometown club Progreso Paysandú at the age of ten, spending five years in their youth system. Saracchi then joined the youth ranks of Danubio.

Danubio
In July 2015, Saracchi was moved to the Danubio first team. He was included in the matchday squad for the first time on 12 August for Danubio's Copa Sudamericana match against Universidad Católica. During that match, Saracchi was subbed on for Ignacio González in the 77th minute, but his competitive debut for the club was cut short when he was subbed off five minutes later following Alejandro Peña's second yellow card and subsequent sending off. The following weekend, Saracchi made his Primera División debut, making another substitute appearance, this time replacing Leandro Sosa in the 63rd minute of a 2-0 away victory over Juventud. A month later, Saracchi made his first start for the club in a 1-1 draw against Sud América in league play. After breaking into the first team throughout the 2015–16 season, Saracchi scored his first goal for the club, in the 77th minute of a 4-1 defeat to Montevideo Wanderers late in the Clausura tournament. It would be his only goal of the season. Saracchi would go on to make 57 appearances for the club, 54 in the league and three in the Copa Sudamericana, alongside netting against El Tanque Sisley and Montevideo Wanderers again for a total of three goals with Danubio.

River Plate
In August 2017, alterations of foreign player requirements in the Argentine Primera División paved the way for Saracchi to sign with River Plate, with the Argentine club paying around €2 million for his services. Saracchi made his debut for the club on 10 September 2017, playing the entirety of a 3-1 league victory over Banfield. Despite spending only one season with the club, Saracchi won several trophies, appearing against Defensa y Justicia, Atlanta, and Atlético Tucumán as River Plate won the Copa Argentina, and then against Boca Juniors in the Supercopa Argentina. In March 2018, interest in Saracchi was reported from Italian clubs Inter Milan and Juventus, although no formal bid was submitted from either club. Throughout 31 appearances in all competitions for River Plate, Saracchi scored once, the opener in River Plate's 4-1 victory over Atlanta.

RB Leipzig
In the summer of 2018, Saracchi moved to German club RB Leipzig for a transfer fee of around €12 million. He made his competitive debut for the club on 26 July 2018, registering 88 minutes before being replaced by Nordi Mukiele in a 4-0 victory over BK Häcken during Europa League qualification. During his first two seasons with Leipzig, Saracchi was mainly a fringe player, making 13 league appearances, eight of which were starts. He scored his first goal for the club on 21 September 2019, netting in the 83rd minute of a 3-0 away victory over Werder Bremen. His contract was terminated on 19 December 2021 by mutual consent.

Galatasaray
In January 2020, Saracchi moved on a year-and-a-half long loan to Turkish club Galatasaray, arriving alongside Henry Onyekuru. Saracchi made his debut for the club on 10 January 2020 in a friendly against Altay. He made his competitive debut for the club a little over a week later, playing the entirety of a 2-1 home victory over Denizlispor. Saracchi registered his first assist for the club in that match, providing the pass for Emre Akbaba's 26th-minute opener.

Levante
On 22 February 2022, Saracchi signed with Levante in Spain until 2024, with an option to extend for three more seasons.

International career
Saracchi is a former Uruguay youth international and was part of under-20 team which won 2017 South American U-20 Championship.

Saracchi made his senior international debut on 12 October 2018, coming on as an 84th-minute substitute for Diego Laxalt in a 2-1 friendly defeat against South Korea. Saracchi was included in Uruguay's squad for the 2019 Copa América tournament, but failed to make an appearance across Uruguay's four matches.

Personal life
Born in Uruguay, Saracchi is of Italian descent.

Career statistics

Club

International

Honours

Club
River Plate
Copa Argentina Champion: 2016–17
Supercopa Argentina Champions" 2017

RB Leipzig
DFB-Pokal Runner-Up: 2018–19

International
Uruguay U20
Sudamericano U20 Champion: 2017

References

External links
 
 
 
 
 Marcelo Saracchi at FOX Sports

1998 births
Living people
Footballers from Paysandú
Association football defenders
Uruguayan footballers
Uruguay international footballers
Uruguay youth international footballers
Uruguay under-20 international footballers
Uruguayan people of Italian descent
Danubio F.C. players
Club Atlético River Plate footballers
RB Leipzig players
Galatasaray S.K. footballers
Levante UD footballers
Uruguayan Primera División players
Argentine Primera División players
Bundesliga players
Süper Lig players
Uruguayan expatriate footballers
Expatriate footballers in Argentina
Expatriate footballers in Germany
Expatriate footballers in Turkey
Expatriate footballers in Spain
Uruguayan expatriate sportspeople in Argentina
Uruguayan expatriate sportspeople in Germany
Uruguayan expatriate sportspeople in Turkey
Uruguayan expatriate sportspeople in Spain
2019 Copa América players